The Murmuring Coast is a 2004 Portuguese drama film directed by Margarida Cardoso.

References

External links 

2004 drama films
2004 films
Portuguese drama films
2000s Portuguese-language films